WRCF-CD (channel 29) is a low-power, Class A television station in Orlando, Florida, United States, broadcasting the Spanish-language UniMás network. It is owned and operated by TelevisaUnivision alongside Melbourne-licensed Univision outlet WVEN-TV (channel 43). Both stations share studios on Douglas Avenue in Altamonte Springs, while WRCF-CD's transmitter is located in unincorporated Bithlo, Florida.

Even though WRCF-CD operates a digital signal of its own, the low-power broadcasting radius only covers the immediate Orlando area. Therefore, in order to reach the entire market, it is simulcast in 720p high definition on WVEN-TV's seventh digital subchannel (43.7) from the same transmitter site.

Sale to Univision
On May 8, 2017, LocusPoint Networks agreed to sell WRCF-CD to Univision Communications' Univision Local Media for $2.5 million. The sale was completed on August 14.

On October 13, 2021, Entravision Communications announced that it was ceding control of WVEN-TV and WRCF-CD back to Univision along with the UniMás affiliation then held by WOTF.

Technical information

Subchannel

Sometime in 2019, WRCF-CD upgraded its channel into 1080i 16:9 high definition. It has previously been offered in 480i 4:3 standard definition.

Logos

References

External links 

UniMás network affiliates
RCF-CD
Television channels and stations established in 1991
1991 establishments in Florida
Low-power television stations in the United States